This is a list of sugar manufacturers in Kenya

Government-owned sugar manufacturers
 Mumias Sugar Company
 Nzoia Sugar Factory
 South Nyanza Sugar Company
 Muhoroni Sugar Company
 Chemelil Sugar Factory

Private sugar manufacturers
 West Kenya Sugar Company
 Sony Sugar Company
 Kibos Sugar and Allied Industries Limited
 Butali Sugar Mills
 Transmara Sugar Company
 Sukari Industries Limited
 Kwale International Sugar Company Limited
 Kisii Sugar Factory
 West Valley Sugar

Output and market share
, the output and market share of each manufacturer was as summarized in the table below:

In 2015, national sugar production totaled 632,000 metric tonnes, the highest production quantity Kenya has ever achieved, on an annual basis.

Recent events
During the first four months of 2020, Kenya produced  of crystalline sugar and imported another  to cover the production deficit, according to the Kenya Sugar Directorate. The table below shows the eight largest sugar manufacturers in the country during the first four months of 2020.

See also
Economy of Kenya

References

External links
 Sugar: The bitter truth
 More imports as sugar production declines by 51percent
 Kenya’s Sugar Industry At Risk
  Africa’s Sugar Ambitions Turn Sour

Agriculture in Kenya
Manufacturing in Kenya
Sugar companies of Kenya
Sugar manufacturers